Archimedes is a genus of bryozoans belonging to the family Fenestellidae. The first use of the term "Archimedes" in relation to this genus was in 1838.

Etymology
 
This genus of bryozoans is named Archimedes because of its corkscrew shape, in analogy to the Archimedes' screw, a type of water pump which inspired modern ship propellers in turn named after the ancient greek polymath. These forms are common as fossils but they have been extinct since the Permian.

Species
Archimedes orientalis Schulga-Nesterenko 1936
Archimedes regina Crockford 1947
Archimedes stuckenbergi Nikiforova 1938

Fossil range
These bryozoans lived from the Carboniferous period (Tournaisian age) to the Permian period (Leonard age) (345.3 to 268.0 Ma), when this genus became extinct.

Description

Archimedes is a genus of fenestrate bryozoans with a calcified skeleton of a delicate spiral-shaped mesh that was thickened near the axis into a massive corkscrew-shaped central structure. The most common remains are fragments of the mesh that are detached from the central structure, and these may not be identified other than by association with the "corkscrews", that are fairly common. Specimens in which the mesh remains attached to the central structure are rare. Like other bryozoans, Archimedes forms colonies, and like other fenestrates, the individuals (or zooids) lived on one side of the mesh, and can be recognized for the two rows of equally distanced rimmed pores. Inside the branches, neighbouring individuals were in contact through small canals. Bryozoans are stationary epifaunal suspension feeders.

Distribution
The majority of fossils of this genus are distributed throughout Europe and North America, but they have also been found in sediments of Afghanistan, Canada, Russia, and Australia.

References

Prehistoric bryozoan genera
Carboniferous first appearances
Permian genus extinctions
Carboniferous animals of Asia
Fossils of Georgia (U.S. state)
Paleozoic life of Alberta
Paleozoic life of Nunavut